Isku is a mountain in the Andes of Peru.

Isku may also refer to:

 Isku Areena, an arena in Lahti, Finland
 Isku-class motor torpedo boat, a ship class of the Finnish Navy
 Tampereen Isku-Volley, a Finnish volleyball team